People awarded the Honorary citizenship of the Republic of San Marino are:

Honorary Citizens of San Marino
Listed by date of award:

References
 

San Marino
San Marino-related lists